Peter, Paul and Mommy, released on Warner Bros. in 1969, is the trio Peter, Paul and Mary's first children's album. It contains hits like "Puff the Magic Dragon", among others. The album reached No. 12 on Billboards Top LPs chart. The single "Day is Done" reached number 7 on the Easy Listening chart and number 21 on the Pop Singles chart.

At the Grammy Awards of 1970, Peter, Paul and Mommy won the Grammy for Best Recording for Children.

Background
According to Paul Stookey, the album grew naturally from the fact that all the previous albums the trio had released contain at least one children's song.
The album contains new songs as well as some songs they had previously recorded. Songs such as "It's Raining" and "Puff (The Magic Dragon)", found on earlier albums, were re-recorded for the album with a backing children choir. The single "Day is Done", written by Peter Yarrow, is also a different recording from the one on the album. "The Marvelous Toy" and "Going To The Zoo" are songs by Tom Paxton.

Track listing

Side one - Toy Side
 "The Marvelous Toy" (Tom Paxton) Cherry Lane Music, Inc. ASCAP
 "Day Is Done" (Peter Yarrow)
 "Leatherwing Bat" (Adapted & Arranged by Yarrow, Stookey)
 "I Have A Song To Sing, O!" (Gilbert & Sullivan, from "Yeomen of the Guard," Adapted & Arranged by Yarrow, Travers, Stookey, Okun)
 "All Through The Night" (Adapted & Arranged by Yarrow, Stookey, Travers)
 "It's Raining" (Adapted & Arranged by Stookey, Yarrow, Chandler)

Side two - Zoo Side
 "Going to the Zoo" (Tom Paxton)  Cherry Lane Music, Inc. ASCAP
 "Boa Constrictor" (Shel Silverstein) Tro-Hollis Music, Inc. BMI
 "Make-Believe Town" (Yarrow, Elaina Mezzetti)
 "Mockingbird" (Adapted & Arranged by Travers, Stookey, Yarrow)
 "Christmas Dinner" (Paul Stookey)
 "Puff (The Magic Dragon)" (Lenny Lipton, Yarrow)

All songs published by Pepamar Music Corp. ASCAP except as indicated.

Personnel
Peter, Paul and Mary
Peter Yarrow – vocals, guitar
Noel "Paul" Stookey – vocals, guitar, banjo
Mary Travers – vocals
with:
Russell Savakus – double bass
Paul Prestopino – guitar, banjo, mandolin, dobro
Technical
Produced by Milton Okun
Musical Director: Milton Okun
Associate Producer: Phil Ramone
Engineers: Don Hahn, Phil Ramone
Front Cover Photo: Allen Vogel
Cover Design: Milton Glaser
Back Cover Photo: Victor Lassiter
Children Appear Through the Courtesy of the Nursery School, Westchester Ethical Society
Direction: Ken Fritz Management, Los Angeles

Charts

See also
Peter, Paul & Mommy, Too

Notes 

1969 albums
Albums produced by Milt Okun
Children's music albums
Peter, Paul and Mary albums
Warner Records albums